Szabolcs Sáfár (born 20 August 1974 in Budapest) is a former Hungarian football goalkeeper.

He obtained 14 caps for the Hungarian national team, and participated at the 1996 Summer Olympics in Atlanta, where Hungary failed to progress from the group stage.

Coaching career

Austria Wien hired Sáfár a goalkeeping coach for their youth section. He is the goalkeeping coach for the U15, U16, U17, and U18 teams.

Honours
Austria Wien

Austrian Football Bundesliga: 2005-2006
Austrian Cup: 2004-2005, 2005–06, 2006-2007, 2008-2009

References

External links

1974 births
Living people
Footballers from Budapest
Hungarian footballers
Hungary international footballers
Footballers at the 1996 Summer Olympics
Olympic footballers of Hungary
Association football goalkeepers
Vasas SC players
FC Red Bull Salzburg players
FK Austria Wien players
FC Spartak Moscow players
FC Wacker Innsbruck (2002) players
Nemzeti Bajnokság I players
Russian Premier League players
Hungarian expatriate footballers
Expatriate footballers in Austria
Expatriate footballers in Russia
Hungarian expatriate sportspeople in Austria
Hungarian expatriate sportspeople in Russia
FK Austria Wien non-playing staff
Association football goalkeeping coaches